The Long Intermission is a 1927 German silent drama film directed by Carl Froelich and starring Henny Porten, Wolfgang von Schwindt and Livio Pavanelli. It is based upon the play written by Oscar Blumenthal and Max Bernstein.

It was shot at the Tempelhof Studios in Berlin. The film's sets were designed by the art director Franz Schroedter.

Cast
 Henny Porten as Gabriele Amberg
 Wolfgang von Schwindt as Graf Torgstädt
 Livio Pavanelli as Lawyer Boretius
 Maria Reisenhofer as Grafin Torgstädt
 Walter Slezak as Ottokar, ihr Sohn
 Iwa Wanja as Komtess Ina Wildborn
 Jenny Marba as Tante Aurelie
 Ludwig Rex as Onkel Eduard
 Paul Westermeier as Vetter Udo
 Sophie Pagay as Haushälterin bei Gabriele
 Leopold von Ledebur
 Max Maximilian as Ein Trainer

References

Bibliography
 Grange, William. Cultural Chronicle of the Weimar Republic. Scarecrow Press, 2008.

External links 
 

1927 films
Films of the Weimar Republic
German drama films
German silent feature films
1927 drama films
Films directed by Carl Froelich
German films based on plays
German black-and-white films
UFA GmbH films
Films shot at Tempelhof Studios
Silent drama films
1920s German films